Rose Martial World is a Chinese-Hong Kong wuxia-romance television series produced by Yu Zheng and directed by Peter Yuen and Wang Shaojie, starring cast members from mainland China and Hong Kong. It was first broadcast in Taiwan in 2008. Yu Zheng later published a novel of the same title during the series' 2009 broadcast in mainland China.

Plot
Due to fate, Jun Qiluo met Sun Siru while collecting dead bodies. As time passes, the two girls grow up and fall in love with the same man, Mu Sheng. Sun Siru is jealous, and Mu Sheng finds out that even though he loves Jun Qiluo, he actually wants a weak woman. He prefers the gentle Siru instead of the rough Jun Qiluo. Mu Sheng distanced himself from Qiluo, and Siru takes advantage of this situation. Qiluo is initially sorrowful, but she forgives Mu Sheng and Siru. She also finds solace with Lin Chuyi, a homeless man.

Soon, Ming Zhixie is hosting a selection for young women. He is the owner of the Ming Castle. Qiluo was initially selected, but Siru offers to replace her. Siru is greedy and thought that she would have a higher social status. However, Ming Zhixie is violent and tortures her. Siru finds out that Ming Zhixie's nephew Ming Shaoqing is interested in her, and together they murder Ming Zhixie. Ming Shaoqing becomes the owner and Siru becomes the lady of the Ming family.

Siru blames her suffering on Qiluo and imprisons Qiluo's whole family. Siru forces Qiluo to marry Chuyi, and Qiluo reluctantly agrees to protect her family. After their marriage, Mu Sheng returns to the Ming Castle. He starts a fight with Chuyi, and the two swordsmen fight gruesomely. They are forced to stop and are kicked out of the Ming Castle.

Years later, Jun Qiluo witnesses Siru and Mu Sheng's marriage. Siru had abandoned Ming Shaoqing to marry her first love. Qiluo, now depressed, swears revenge against the Siru and Mu Sheng with the help of Chuyi.

Cast
 Huo Siyan as Jun Qiluo, based on Lu Zhi
 Sun Feifei as Shen Siru, based on Consort Yu
 Zhang Xueying as young Shen Siru
 Wallace Chung as Mu Sheng, based on Xiang Yu
 Mickey He as Lin Chuyi, based on Liu Bang
 Sheren Tang as Yin Xuehan
 Damian Lau as Jun Wuji
 Sammul Chan as Ming Shaoqing, based on Ziying
 Feng Shaofeng as Cen Yetong, based on Han Xin
 Wang Xiaochen as Hua Jieyu
 Xiao Yuyu as Yang Xibing, based on Lady Qi
 Liu Guanxiang as Ming Bujie
 Zhang Chunzhong as Yuan Tiangang
 Lee Yiu-ging as Li Shenlong
 Song Yang as He Shuwei
 Ma Ming as Hong Liang

External links
 Rose Martial World on Sina.com

2008 Chinese television series debuts
2008 Chinese television series endings
2008 Hong Kong television series debuts
2008 Hong Kong television series endings
Chinese wuxia television series
Hong Kong wuxia television series
Hong Kong romance television series
Mandarin-language television shows
Television shows written by Yu Zheng
Television series by H&R Century Pictures
Television series by Huanyu Film
2000s romance television series
2000s Hong Kong television series